The 2022 IIHF Women's World Championship Division II were two international ice hockey tournaments organised by the International Ice Hockey Federation (IIHF).

The Group A tournament was played in Jaca, Spain, from 3 to 8 April 2022 and the Group B tournament in Zagreb, Croatia, from 17 to 22 May 2022.

Entering the competition, there were no divisional changes, as the 2021 event was cancelled due to the COVID-19 pandemic.

Great Britain won the Group A tournament and was promoted, while Mexico was relegated. Iceland won Group B and Croatia finished last.

Group A tournament

Participants

Match officials
Three referees and five linesmen were selected for the tournament.

Standings

Results
All times are local (UTC+2)

Statistics

Scoring leaders
List shows the top skaters sorted by points, then goals.

GP = Games played; G = Goals; A = Assists; Pts = Points; +/− = Plus/Minus; PIM = Penalties in Minutes; POS = Position
Source: IIHF.com

Goaltending leaders
Only the top five goaltenders, based on save percentage, who have played at least 40% of their team's minutes, are included in this list.

TOI = time on ice (minutes:seconds); SA = shots against; GA = goals against; GAA = goals against average; Sv% = save percentage; SO = shutouts
Source: IIHF.com

Awards

Group B tournament

After several teams withdrew from the tournament, the IIHF changed the date from March to mid-May and all six teams are eligible to participate.

Participants

Match officials
Three referees and five linesmen were selected for the tournament.

Standings

Results
All times are local (UTC+2)

Statistics

Scoring leaders
List shows the top skaters sorted by points, then goals.

GP = Games played; G = Goals; A = Assists; Pts = Points; +/− = Plus/Minus; PIM = Penalties in Minutes; POS = Position
Source: IIHF.com

Goaltending leaders
Only the top five goaltenders, based on save percentage, who have played at least 40% of their team's minutes, are included in this list.

TOI = time on ice (minutes:seconds); SA = shots against; GA = goals against; GAA = goals against average; Sv% = save percentage; SO = shutouts
Source: IIHF.com

Awards

References

External links
Official website of IIHF

2022
Division II
2022 IIHF Women's World Championship Division II
2022 IIHF Women's World Championship Division II
IIHF
IIHF
Sport in Aragon
Sports competitions in Zagreb
IIHF
IIHF